War of the Range is a 1933 American western film directed by J.P. McGowan and starring Tom Tyler, Charles K. French and Lane Chandler. It was made by the independent Poverty Row company the Monarch Film Corporation.

Cast
 Tom Tyler as Tom Bradley
 Charles K. French as 	Duke Bradley
 Ted Adams as Jim Warren 
 Lane Chandler as Henchman Bull Harris
 Caryl Lincoln as Grace Carlysle
 William Malan as Dad Carlysle
 Wesley Giraud as Jimmy Carlysle
 Fred Burns as Sheriff Ben Barlow
 Slim Whitaker as 	Henchman Hank 
 Billy Franey as 	Tony 
 Lafe McKee as Cattle Buyer Cartwright

References

Bibliography
 Pitts, Michael R. Western Movies: A Guide to 5,105 Feature Films. McFarland, 2012.

External links
 

1933 films
1933 Western (genre) films
1930s English-language films
American Western (genre) films
Films directed by J. P. McGowan
American black-and-white films
1930s American films